This list of academic awards is an index to articles about notable awards given for academic contributions. It does not include professorships, fellowships or student awards other than awards to students who have made an original contribution to an academic field. The country of the institution granting the award is given, but many awards are open to people from around the world.

International

Africa

Americas

Asia

Europe

Oceania

See also

 Lists of awards
 List of education awards
 List of student awards
 Teacher award

References

 
Academic
Academic